The 2016–17 season was Gillingham's 124th season in their existence and fourth consecutive season in League One. Along with League One, the club participated in the FA Cup, League Cup and Football League Trophy.

The season covers the period from 1 July 2016 to 30 June 2017.

Transfers

Transfers in

Transfers out

Loans in

Loans out

Competitions

Pre-season friendlies

League One

League table

Matches

FA Cup

EFL Cup 
On 22 June 2016, the first round draw was made, Gillingham were drawn away against Southend United.

EFL Trophy

References

Gillingham F.C. seasons
Gillingham